The Battle of Mount Longdon was a battle fought between the British 3rd Battalion, Parachute Regiment and elements of the Argentine 7th Infantry Regiment on 11–12 June 1982, towards the end of the Falklands War. It was one of three engagements in a Brigade-size operation that night, along with the Battle of Mount Harriet and the Battle of Two Sisters. A mixture of hand-to-hand fighting and ranged combat resulted in the British occupying this key position around the Argentine garrison at Port Stanley.

Background

British forces
The British force consisted of the  Third Battalion, the Parachute Regiment (3 PARA), under Lieutenant Colonel Hew Pike.  Artillery support came from six 105mm L118 light guns of 29 Commando Regiment, Royal Artillery, and the 4.5-in gun of the Type 21 frigate, . Second Battalion, the Parachute Regiment (2 PARA) were held in reserve.

Argentine forces
The Argentine forces consisted of B Company, 7th Infantry Regiment (RI 7), part of 10th Mechanized Infantry Brigade, as well as detachments from other units. The local Argentine commander was 34-year-old Major Carlos Carrizo Salvadores, the second-in-command of RI 7. The 7th Infantry Regiment, reinforced by two Marine Infantry platoons, held Mount Longdon, Wireless Ridge (to the northwest of the Capital), Port Stanley, and Cortley Ridge (to the east). Marine Teniente de Navío (naval rank equivalent to army captain) Sergio Andrés Dachary had arrived at Mount Longdon in the week preceding the battle and was on hand to direct the Marine-manned heavy machine-guns protecting the Infantry stationed there.

The Argentine forces on Mount Longdon were recalled reservists with a year of military training. Part of this training saw the 7th Regiment undertake major all-arms collective training in central Argentina alongside the 3rd and 6th Infantry Regiments of the 10th Brigade. The young RI 7 soldiers were not going to abandon their positions easily and several were prepared to hold their ground. They possessed fully automatic FN FAL rifles, FAP light machine guns and PAMS sub-machine guns; these fully-automatic weapons delivered more firepower than the similar but semi-automatic British L1A1 rifles (SLR). They were also equipped with FN MAG 7.62mm general purpose machine guns, which were almost identical to those of the British.

At their San Miguel del Monte training camp the 7th Regiment companies prepared for a possible war against Chile and carried out helicopter drills with the 601st Combat Aviation Battalion. Approximately fifty members of the 7th Regiment fought more resolutely than the rest and shared their skills, having been put through a commando course organized by commando-trained Major Oscar Jaimet, the Operations Officer of the 6th Infantry Regiment (RI 6). Private Jorge Altieri in an interview after the war told how he trained hard (under training organized by Drill-Sergeant Pedro Maciel Reyes) with B Company:

I was issued with a FAL 7.62 rifle. Other guys were given FAP light machine guns – and others got PAMS [sub-machine guns]. The main emphasis in shooting was making every bullet count. I was also shown how to use a bazooka, how to make and lay booby-traps, and how to navigate at night, and we went on helicopter drills, night and day attacks and ambushes.

Altieri, of Sub-Lieutenant Juan Domingo Baldini's 1st Platoon, would also claim that the conscripts experienced hunger, despite permission to go through stockpiled rations on Mount Longdon:

During wartime, the higher ranking officers are in totally different places ... Sub-Lieutenant Baldini would receive orders from Major Carrizo who was further down, to use our cold rations and that the more nutritious food we'd get when the fighting started because they didn't know if they'd be able to supply us with food. From 16 April to 11 June we fought, we'd have soup with lentils, green peas and some piece of mutton. We would tell our officer: "We can't tell the British soldiers to wait so that we could get better food and then start shooting ... We weren't properly fed prior to the fighting like we should've been, we were weakened. 

The experiences in Baldini's platoon varied from soldier to soldier. Private Luis Aparicio claims that he and others once escaped into Port Stanley where they were able to buy cigarettes, jam, bread, apples and cookies and that the corporal in charge of his group would allow them to shoot and eat sheep, but that in the last 20 days they hardly got any food. He also admits that the 1st Platoon was taken off the mountain twice, in April and at the beginning of May, so that the soldiers could get a chance to shower in Port Stanley and that on the last march into town, the men were allowed to stay there under roofs overnight. Private Carlos Amato claims that Baldini had a net stretched outside his tent that contained tinned provisions for his men, but claims these rations were of poor quality, although he would consume them after getting a fellow conscript to heat them up first and that the NCOs in the platoon had no qualms about eating the cold rations made available to everybody in 1st Platoon. Sergio Delgado claims that he hated his section leader, Corporal Geronimo Diaz of the 1st Platoon, but says that the NCO allowed him and four other conscripts to drink several cans of beer that had been helicoptered forward. Private Alberto Carbone claims that Baldini would always get him to go and look for firewood so that the officer could heat up his food while the remainder of the platoon "starved" and that Baldini "clashed with everyone" and was left to himself and "died alone" as a result.

Subteniente Baldini is accused of having handed out field punishment to a number of conscripts for abandoning their posts to go looking for food. "Our own officers were our greatest enemies", says Ernesto Alonso of Baldini's platoon, who later became the president of CECIM, an anti-war veterans group founded by Rodolfo Carrizo and former conscripts of the 7th Regiment. "They supplied themselves with whisky from the pubs, but they weren’t prepared for war. They disappeared when things got serious." Alonso also claims the conscripts on Mount Longdon fought “without any type of leadership from our commanders, the officers and NCOs." Alonso admits he took no part in the fighting for he was evacuated during the daylight hours of 11 June, a victim of shell-shock during an artillery bombardment. The previous day, Private Carbone had also been evacuated after he shot himself in his left thigh while inside his tent, as revealed in the book Two Sides of Hell (Bloomsbury Publishing, 1994). Baldini applied first-aid and allowed the conscript to be taken down the mountain, where a helicopter arrived to take the wounded soldier to Stanley Hospital, but not before coming under rifle fire from nervous Argentine sentries on Wireless Ridge that damaged the helicopter.

British Warrant Officer Nick van der Bijl (who interviewed Argentine POWs), maintains that the defenders on Mount Longdon were helped to make themselves as comfortable as possible under the circumstances and that their officers, including Baldini, tried hard to bolster morale:

Baldini was later heavily criticized by veterans for being indifferent and selfish toward his men, although this seems to have come from several petulant soldiers who failed to appreciate his efforts to keep them alive in difficult conditions.

Baldini was reported to have handed cups of hot chocolate milk to his sodden conscripts in late May 1982.

In 2016, Victor José Bruno (former 7th Regiment private) spoke in defense of Subteniente Baldini, claiming that the officer would happily share his cigarettes with the smokers in his platoon and that Baldini, although suffering from the onset of a serious case of trench foot, refused to be evacuated.

In 2009, Argentine authorities in Comodoro Rivadavia ratified a decision made by authorities in Río Grande, Tierra del Fuego (which, according to Argentina, have authority over the islands), announcing their intention to charge 70 officers and NCOs with inhumane treatment of conscript soldiers during the war.

"We have testimony from 23 people about a soldier who was shot to death by a corporal, four other former combatants who starved to death, and at least 15 cases of conscripts who were staked out on the ground", Pablo Vassel, president of the Human Rights Department of the province of Corrientes, told Inter Press Service News Agency. The conscript that was allegedly "shot to death", has been identified as Marine Private Rito Portillo, who according to the military surgeon that attended him (Major Andino Luis Francisco), was shot in error on the night of 4–5 May when returning to his tent from nearby latrines. There are serious claims that false testimonies were used as evidence in accusing the Argentine officers and NCOs and Vassel had to step down from his post in 2010.
Since the 2009 announcement was made, no one in the military or among the retired officers and NCOs has been charged, causing Pablo Vassel in April 2014 to comment:

For over two years we've been waiting for a final say on behalf of the courts ...  There are some types of crimes that no state should allow to go unpunished, no matter how much time has passed, such as the crimes of the dictatorship. Last year Germany sentenced a 98-year-old corporal for his role in the concentration camps in one of the Eastern European countries occupied by Nazi Germany. It didn't take into account his age or rank.

In 2016, retired-Colonel Horacio Sánchez Mariño (former 601 Combat Aviation Battalion pilot), in an online newspaper article criticized the anti-war veterans' group CECIM for accusing the Argentine Army of dereliction of duty, accusing the veterans association of being caranchos (vultures) that lived off the Argentine dead.

Battle

British advance
3 PARA and the supporting Royal Engineers from the 9 Parachute Squadron RE made a desperate march across the hills north of Mount Simon to seize the key piece of high ground above the settlement of Estancia, also known as Estancia House. The weather conditions were atrocious, with the Paras marching through steep slippery hillocks to the objective. Nick Rose was a private in 6 Platoon under Lieutenant Jonathan Shaw:

The terrain dictated exactly how we advanced. A lot of the time if we were going along on tracks – what few we did go on – we used Indian file, which is staggered file on either side of the track, like a zig-zag. But there are great rivers of rock – big white boulders – and you have to cross them and then there's the heather and the gorse and its constantly wet. So the wind chill factor was – I think somebody said minus 40 degrees – and storm force winds and horizontal rain – a nightmare scenario. ... We are horrible, we're miserable as sin, all of us – we're missing home, want a dry fag [cigarette], warm, dry boots, a cheese and onion sandwich and a bottle of blue top milk. I used to dream of these.

Captain Matthew Selfridge of 3 PARA and Captain Robbie Burns from the 9th Parachute Squadron (Royal Engineers) set up a patrol base near Murrell Bridge, two kilometres west of Mount Longdon on 3 June, protected by 4 Platoon (under Lieutenant Ian Bickerdike) from B Company.
From their forward operating base, Selfridge and Burns dispatched patrols to scout and harass the Argentine positions on Mount Longdon. A Royal Engineer of 2 Troop (Lance-Corporal Hare) was seriously wounded while on patrol with 3 PARA.

Terry Peck, a former FIDF member also carried out patrolling, and in early June, while pretending to have gotten lost while riding his motorbike, he chatted to a group of five conscripts (under Corporal Geronimo Diaz of Baldini's 1st Platoon) that had been tasked with guarding provisions that had been helicoptered forward and were relaxing in the sun after drinking several cans of beer on the eastern end of Mount Longdon. Not long after this successful foray, Peck, while guiding a close-target-reconnaissance patrol (under Corporal Peter Hadden) opened fire in error at Sergeant John Pettinger's standing patrol also from 3 PARA's D Company, but no British casualties were registered in this friendly fire incident.

On the night of 4–5 June, a British three-man patrol from D Company (consisting of Corporal Jerry Phillips and Privates Richard Absolon and Bill Hayward) was sent out to the northern slopes of Mount Longdon, detailed to penetrate Sub-Lieutenant Juan Baldini's 1st Platoon on the western slopes and secure a prisoner. They were supported to their rear by a battery of six 105mm field guns, under cover of which specialist snipers fired at Baldini's Platoon, while another fired a 66mm anti-tank rocket at one of the 1st Platoon mortar pits (under Corporal Óscar Carrizo). The Argentine commanders reacted quickly and the British patrol found themselves under accurate machine gun, artillery and mortar fire. There were no Argentine casualties, although one British participant claimed to have shot and killed two Argentines and demolished the mortar crew with a rocket at close range.

On the Argentine side, the 7th Infantry Regiment Reconnaissance Platoon (under Second Lieutenant Francisco Ramón Galíndez Matienzo) on the surrounding Wireless Ridge position was not able to conduct their own patrolling, as they had been designated the Argentine reserve on Wireless Ridge. Therefore Argentine Commando units, normally used for deep reconnaissance, were used to take on this role, and they were able to do so with some success.

In the early hours of 7 June, a combined patrol of 601 Commando Company and 601 National Gendarmerie Special Forces Squadron approached the Murrell Bridge following reports from Major Jaimet of enemy activity in the area. After several nights in the area, British patrols led by Corporals Peter Hadden and Mark Brown had just arrived at the bluff on the western bank of the Murrell River, which Sergeant Ian Addle's patrol was using as a base. Shortly afterwards, a sentry reported movement in the vicinity of the bridge. The Paras opened fire and a confused firefight developed in the darkness, with small arms, machine gun, British LAW rockets and Argentine Energa rifle grenades being exchanged. Captain Rubén Teófilo Figueroa's 2nd Assault Section (from 601 Commando Company) was very aggressive, and before dawn forced the Paras to withdraw while leaving behind most of their equipment. Argentine Sergeant Rubén Poggi was slightly wounded during the Argentine counter-ambush. The official history of the Parachute Regiment acknowledges:

They were forced to evacuate their position rapidly, leaving behind their packs and radio, but succeeded in withdrawing without suffering any casualties. The location was checked on the evening of 8 June by another patrol, but there was no sign of the packs or radio, which meant the battalion's radio net could have been compromised.

From then on, British patrols had to be mounted closer to their own lines.

That same night, another 8-man section (under Corporal Oscar Nicolás Albornoz-Guevara), from the 4th Regiment's C Company on nearby Two Sisters Mountain, attempted to map out the British positions in the Estancia House area; but British lookouts detected this force and 3 PARA's Mortar Platoon repelled the Argentine patrol.

Nevertheless, despite evidence of Argentine patrol, Colonel Pike and his company commanders on the eve of battle still held the Argentine regulars in low regard and did not expect them to put up much resistance. For this reason, the British hoped to surprise the Argentine commanders by advancing as close to their forward platoon as possible under cover of darkness, before rushing the Argentine trenches. The three major objectives – 'Fly Half', 'Full Back' and 'Wing Forward' – were named after positions in Rugby football. B Company would attack through 'Fly Half' and proceed to 'Full Back', while A Company, followed by C Company if necessary, would do the same on Wireless Ridge.

Private Fabián Passaro of B Company served on Mount Longdon with Baldini's 1st Platoon and remembers life at the time:

Most of us had adjusted to what we'd been landed in, we'd adjusted to the war. But some boys [identified in the book "Two Sides Of Hell/Los Dos Lados Del Infierno"] were still very depressed and, in many cases, were getting worse all the time. Of course, we were very fed up with wearing the same clothes for so many days, going without a shower, being so cold, eating badly. It was too many things together, quite apart from our natural fear of the war, the shelling and all that. But I think some of us were adapting better than others. There were kids who were very worried, and I tried to buoy them up a bit. 'Don't worry,' I told them. 'Nothing will happen, we're safe here. 'Don't you see they could never get right up here? There's one thousand of us; if they try to climb, we'll see them, we'll shoot the shit out of them."

When 3 PARA's B Company (under Major Mike Argue) fixed bayonets to storm the Argentine 1st Platoon positions on Mount Longdon, they found themselves trapped in a minefield. British sappers subsequently counted some 1,500 anti-personnel mines that Lieutenant Diego Arreseigor's platoon of Sappers from the 10th Mechanized Engineer Company had laid along the western and northern slopes of Mount Longdon. Corporal Peter Cuxson recalled, 

but only two exploded because the rest were frozen. Otherwise, the final battle for Port Stanley would have been an altogether different story.

Assault on Mount Longdon
As dusk set-in, 3 PARA moved to their start lines and began to make the four-hour-long advance on their objectives. As B Company approached Mount Longdon, Corporal Brian Milne stepped on a mine, which alerted Sub-Lieutenant Baldini's platoon who emerged from their tents to lay down fire just as Lieutenant Ian Bickerdike's No. 4 Platoon reached their positions.  Corporal Stewart McLaughlin was seen clearing out an Argentine 7.62mm machine gun from the high ground overlooking the western slopes.

Lieutenant Jonathan Shaw's No. 6 Platoon, on the right flank of B Company, captured the summit of 'Fly Half' with no fighting. However, they had missed a number of Argentine troops from the 3rd Platoon and these launched an attack on the rear of the unsuspecting platoon, resulting in a number of casualties before the area was cleared. For three hours the hand-to-hand combat raged in the 1st Platoon sector until the Paras drove out the defenders.

Throughout the 1st Platoon position, small groups of soldiers were fighting for their lives. Privates Ben Gough and Dominic Gray managed to crawl undetected up to an Argentine bunker and crouch beside it as the Marine conscripts inside fired at the British. The two Paras each 'posted' a grenade through the firing slit of the bunker then jumped in and engaged the Marines with fixed bayonets. Private Gray killed a Marine by sticking his bayonet through his eye socket. They were both mentioned in despatches following the battle.

Marine Corporal Carlos Rafael Colemil was part of the forward defence and fought as a sniper:
A British soldier climbed over the rock which supported the accommodation bunker of the 105mm gun crew, and from there he was silhouetted. He screamed like he was giving out orders. I aimed and fired and he fell, then Conscript Daniel Ferrandis alerted me to the approach of three British soldiers on the flank. I observed with a night sight; they were very close. I saw one of them was carrying a gun with a bipod; he fell at the first shot and shouted. Another man approached him and I fired again and also got him ... Many people fell to the ground screaming, but soon the enemy was aware of my presence and every time I fired a shot I received a great deal of fire in response. Not long after my main action, I was wounded ... We could also hear the cries for help from the Rasit radar operator Sergeant Roque Nista, who was wounded. I could hear Sergeant Omar Cabral, who was a sniper: he was also firing.

According to the account of Private Victor José Bruno, Baldini was killed as he tried to unjam a machine gun. "The Lieutenant pushed us back and stood up trying to unlock the barrel but then he was shot in his belly by enemy fire", he recalled in an interview with Eduardo César Gerding of the Nottingham Malvinas Group. Corporal Dario Ríos was found lying dead with his platoon commander, which disproves Private Carbone's claim that Baldini "died alone". Baldini's weapon and boots were removed for the use of British soldiers. Also killed in the initial fighting was Cavalry Sergeant Jorge Alberto Ron (according to Private Altieri who was wounded in the blast that killed the NCO) and the Argentine forward artillery observation officer, Lieutenant Alberto Rolando Ramos, whose last message was that his position was surrounded. Sub-Lieutenant Baldini was awarded the Argentine Nation to the Valour in Combat Medal.

Argentine reinforcements 
When the 2nd Lieutenant Enrique Neirotti's 3rd Platoon on the southern half, and Staff Sergeant Raúl González's 2nd Platoon on the northern half of the mountain was about to be overrun, reinforcements from 2nd Lieutenant Hugo Quiroga's 1st Platoon, 10th Engineer Company on 'Full Back' arrived to help Neirotti and González. Throughout the initial fighting in this sector, most of the Argentine positions on the saddle of the mountain held, with the rifle mounted night sights used by the newly arrived engineers proving particularly deadly to the Paras.

Private Nick Rose in 6 Platoon recalls:

Pete Gray stood up and went to throw a grenade and he was shot by a sniper in his left forearm. We thought the grenade had gone off. We punched his arm down onto the ground to staunch the bleeding, believing he'd lost half his right forearm and hand, but it was still there and his arm bent at the forearm instead of the elbow – a horrible thing to watch. ...There's 'incoming' everywhere, loads of stuff going down the range and then 'bang' my pal "Fester" [Tony Greenwood], gets it just above his left eye, only a yard away from me. That was a terrible thing. 'Fester' was such a lovely guy. Then it was 'Baz' Barratt. 'Baz' had gone back to try to get field dressings for Pete Gray and [as] he was coming back, 'bang', he got it in the back. This was when we just stalled as a platoon. (Jon Cooksey, op. cit., p. 66)

The battle was going badly for Major Mike Argue. Argentine resistance was strong and well organized. At the centre of the mountain were Marine conscripts Jorge Maciel and Claudio Scaglione in a bunker with a heavy machine gun, and Marine conscripts Luis Fernández and Sergio Giuseppetti with night-scope equipped rifles.

As Lieutenant Wright (SAS), his signaller and Sergeant Ian McKay and a number of other men in No. 4 Platoon were performing reconnaissance on the Marine position, the platoon commander and signaller were wounded. Sergeant McKay, realising something needed to be done, decided to attack the Marine position that was causing so much damage.

The assault was met by a hail of fire. Corporal Ian Bailey was seriously wounded, Private Jason Burt was killed and another wounded. Despite these losses Sergeant McKay, with complete disregard for his own safety, for which he was to win a posthumous Victoria Cross, continued to charge the enemy position alone, lobbing grenades, and was killed. Peter Harclerode, who was granted open access to the war diary of the 3rd Battalion and subsequently wrote PARA! (Arms & Armour Press, 1993), pointed out that McKay and his team cleared several Marine riflemen from the position but didn't neutralize the heavy machine gun.  Later, Corporal McLaughlin managed to crawl to within grenade-throwing range of the Marine heavy-machine gun team, but despite several efforts with fragmentation grenades and 66mm rockets, he was also unable to silence it.

Major Carrizo-Salvadores on 'Full Back' had remained in touch with the Argentine commanders in Port Stanley:

Around midnight I asked RHQ for infantry reinforcements, and I was given a rifle platoon from Captain Hugo García's C Company. First Lieutenant Raúl Fernando Castañeda gathered the sections of his platoon, hooked around First Sergeant Raúl González's 2nd Platoon that was already fighting and delivered a counterattack [at about 2am local time]. The Platoon fought with great courage in fierce hand-to-hand combat and the battle raged for two more hours, but gradually the enemy broke contact and withdrew while being engaged by artillery strikes.

Argentine counterattack 
Major Carrizo-Salvadores manoeuvred Castañeda's reinforced platoon to close with 4 and 5 Platoons; meanwhile, under the direction of Corporal Jorge Daniel Arribas, part of Castañeda's platoon converged on the British aid post. Colour Sergeant Brian Faulkner, seeing that more than 20 wounded Paras on the western slopes of the mountain were about to fall into the hands of Corporal Arribas, deployed anyone fit enough to defend the position.

"I picked four blokes and got up on this high feature, and as I did so this troop of twenty or thirty Argentines [in fact a reinforced section of just fifteen riflemen under Corporal Arribas] were coming towards us. We just opened fire on them. We don't know how many we killed, but they got what they deserved because none of them were left standing when we'd finished with them." said Faulkner.

Major Argue's company ceased firing and devoted all their efforts to a withdrawal from 'Fly Half' due to terrible situation. Peter Harclerode, a noted British historian of the Parachute Regiment, went on record, saying that:

Under covering fire, Nos. 4 and 5 Platoons withdrew, but another man was killed and others wounded in the process. At that point, Lieutenant Colonel Hew Pike and his 'R' Group arrived on the scene and Major Argue briefed him on the situation. Shortly afterwards, Company Sergeant-Major Weeks reported that both platoons had pulled back to a safe distance and that all the wounded had been recovered. The dead, however, had to be left where they had fallen. Meanwhile, on the southern slope of the objective, the wounded from No. 6 Platoon were being evacuated while the rest remained under cover of the rocks.

The British 3rd Commando Brigade commander, Brigadier Julian Thompson was reported to have said:

 "I was on the point of withdrawing my Paras from Mount Longdon. We couldn't believe that these teenagers disguised as soldiers were causing us to suffer many casualties."

By the time the 21 survivors of Castañeda's 46-man platoon had worked their way off the mountain, they were utterly exhausted with six killed and twenty-one wounded in the counterattack.One of them, Private Leonardo Rondi, was wearing a maroon beret – taken from a dead Parachute Regiment soldier. Private Rondi, having dodged groups of Paras to deliver messages to Castañeda's section leaders after the loss of the radio operator, had found the body of a Para behind a rock (it may have been Sergeant McKay) and took his red beret and SLR which he later gave to the Argentine commanders as trophies. Rondi was awarded the Argentine Nation to the Valour in Combat Medal.

British resume the attack
Following the unexpectedly fierce fighting on 'Fly Half', Major Argue pulled back Nos. 4, and 5 Platoons whilst 29 Commando Regiment directed artillery fire at the mountain from Mount Kent, after which the area was flanked from the left. Under heavy fire, the remnants of 4 and 5 Platoons, under Lieutenant Mark Cox, advanced upon their objective of 'Full Back', taking some casualties from Casteñeda's platoon in the form of Corporal Julio Nardielo Mamani's section as they did so. As he was clearing the Argentine position, Private Grey was injured from a headshot but refused to be evacuated until Major Argue had consolidated his troops properly in their positions on 'Fly Half'. Private Kevin Connery dispatched three wounded Argentines in this action. The Paras could not move any further without taking unacceptable losses and so were pulled back to the western end of Mount Longdon, with the orders for Major David Collett's A Company to move through B Company and assault, from the west, the eastern objective of 'Full Back', a heavily defended position, with covering fire being given from Support Company.

Lieutenant David Wright and Second Lieutenant Ian Moore mustered their platoons near the western summit and had briefed them on how to deal with the enemy. They then attacked the position, clearing it of the Argentine garrison with rifle, grenade and bayonet in close quarters combat. As A Company was clearing the final positions, Corporal McLaughlin was injured by a Czekalski recoilless rifle round fired from Wireless Ridge (reportedly the anti-tank gun operated by Corporals Julio César Canteros and Jorge Norberto González from the 7th Regiment Recce Platoon on nearby 'Rough Diamond') and was subsequently killed by an 81mm round fired from First Sergeant Mario Ricardo Alcaide's Mortar Platoon also on 'Rough Diamond' as he was making his way to the aid post.

The Argentines vigorously defended 'Full Back'. Although already wounded, Corporal Manuel Medina of Castañeda's platoon took over a recoilless rifle detachment and fired along the ridge at Support Company, killing three Paras, including Private Peter Heddicker, who took the full force of a 105mm anti-tank round, and wounding three others. Major Carrizo-Salvadores abandoned his command bunker on 'Full Back' when a MILAN missile detonated against rocks just behind him. In the command bunker Major Collett found 2,000 cigarettes, which he gave to the smokers in his company.

The swearing in English on the part of the Argentines and the discovery of several dead Argentine Marines dressed in camouflaged uniforms at first led the Paras to believe they had encountered mercenaries from the United States.

Aftermath

The battle lasted twelve hours and had been costly to both sides. 3 PARA lost seventeen killed during the battle; one Royal Engineer attached to 3 PARA also died. Two of the 3 PARA dead – Privates Ian Scrivens and Jason Burt – were only seventeen years old, and Private Neil Grose was killed on his 18th birthday. Forty British paratroopers were wounded. A further four Paras and one REME craftsman were killed and seven paratroopers wounded in the two-day shelling that followed, directed by Sub-Lieutenant Marcelo de Marco of the 5th Marines on Tumbledown Mountain. Several Paras were also wounded by the counter-fire directed by the Argentine Forward Artillery Observation Officer (Major Guillermo Nani) on Wireless Ridge on the night of 13–14 June. Another eight Paras had been wounded in an earlier friendly fire incident. A Royal Marine Commando Sapper (Sergeant Peter Thorpe) was also wounded on the western lower slopes of Mount Longdon in the daylight hours of 12 June, when he was sent forward to assist a number of injured members of an artillery battery trapped inside a disabled Snowcat tracked vehicle that had run into a minefield. The Argentines suffered 31 dead, 120 wounded, and 50 taken prisoner.

Lance-Corporal Vincent Bramley was patrolling the western half of Mount Longdon when he was confronted with the full horror of the night combat. The 3 PARA NCO and keen writer stumbled upon the bodies of five Paratroopers killed by Neirotti's 3rd Platoon.

A few bullets whizzed overhead and smashed into the rocks. A corporal shouted that Tumbledown was firing at us. We ran into a tight gap in the path [and] came to an abrupt halt, as it was a dead end. Four or five bodies lay sprawled there, close together. This time they were our own men: the camouflaged Para smocks hit my eyes immediately. CSM [Company-Sergeant-Major] Weeks was standing over them like a guardian, screaming at some of his men to cover the further end of the path and a small crest. The CSM and Sergeant P [Pettinger] exchanged quick words. I wasn't listening; my mind was totally occupied with looking into the crags for the enemy. I turned and looked at our own lads, dead on the ground, mowed down when they tried to rush through this gap. I felt both anger and sadness. The CSM's face showed the strain of having seen most of his company either wounded or shot dead. That night's fighting was written in every line of his face.

Decorations
The 3rd Battalion of the Parachute Regiment won numerous decorations for this action:
 One Victoria Cross (Sergeant Ian McKay) 
 One Distinguished Service Order (Lieutenant-Colonel Hew Pike)
 Two Military Crosses (Majors Mike Argue and David Collett)
 Two Distinguished Conduct Medals (Colour Sergeant Brian Faulkner and Sergeant John Pettinger)
 Three Military Medals (Sergeant Des Fuller, Corporal Ian Bailey, and Private Richard Absolon)
 Numerous Mentioned in Despatches

References

External links
 A Night to Remember: 3 Para on Mount Longdon
 'I was told of Ian's death on the same day the ceasefire was announced', by his widow Marica McKay, whose husband Sergeant Ian McKay was killed storming a position that was pinning his platoon down
 Reassessing the Fighting Performance of Conscript Soldiers during the Malvinas/Falklands War (1982) by Alejandro L. Corbacho
 Former 7th Argentine Infantry Regiment veterans website
 Mount Longdon: The Argentine Story
 Recollections of Anglo-Argentine conscript Michael Savage of the 7th Infantry Regiment's C Company

Conflicts in 1982
1982 in the British Empire
1982 in the Falkland Islands
Battles of the Falklands War
Parachute Regiment (United Kingdom)
British Army in the Falklands War
Battles involving the United Kingdom
Battles involving Argentina
June 1982 events in South America